Thomas Bimis (born 11 June 1975) is a Greek diver.  He was born in Athens.

Career
Bimis competed in the synchronised 3 metre springboard competition at the 2004 Summer Olympics, where he won the gold medal together with Nikolaos Siranidis. This was Greece's first-ever gold medal in diving and the hosts' first gold of the 2004 Athens Olympics, and the diver pair therefore became very popular in Greece.

Bimis also competed in the 2000 Olympic Games in Sydney, where he placed 32nd in the 3 Metre Springboard competition.

References
 

1975 births
Living people
Sportspeople from Athens
Greek male divers
Divers at the 2000 Summer Olympics
Divers at the 2004 Summer Olympics
Olympic gold medalists for Greece
Olympic divers of Greece
Olympic medalists in diving
Medalists at the 2004 Summer Olympics